Pecel ayam (Javanese: pecel pitik) is a traditional chicken dish of the Kemiren Banyuwangi Osing tribe of East Java, Indonesia.

Ingredients
Pecel ayam is made with chicken and coconut sauce cooked in salted tamarind water. The sauce requires grain coconut, garlic, onions, peanuts, cutchery, kaffir lime leaves, fried nutmeg, a sachet of shrimp paste and optionally for added spice, cayenne or chili. Basil leaf and lime juice may also be added. Sugar, salt and MSG are also added.

Method
The ingredients for pecel ayam must be prepared beforehand. The chicken is rubbed in tamarind water, salt, and spices, and baked until cooked and browned. Then, the chicken is drained and shred. After that, the grated coconut is cooked. Added spices include fried nutmeg, salt, chili, and peanuts that have been roasted. The seasoning is mixed with chicken that has been cut in several pieces. Optionally,  lime juice is added. Finally, pecel ayam is ready to serve.

See also

Cuisine of Indonesia
Javanese cuisine
Nasi pecel
Pecel
Pecel lele

References

Javanese cuisine
Indonesian chicken dishes
Chicken dishes